Five Creek is a westward flowing stream that rises in the city of Rohnert Park, California, United States and discharges to the Laguna de Santa Rosa. The creek is channelized as it flows through the city and runs in an artificially rectilinear fashion. Considered waters of the United States as a jurisdictional matter, Five Creek has potential habitat for the California red-legged frog and the Western pond turtle.

The name probably originated as a misreading of "Fire Creek," the name found on older maps.

Course
The route of Five Creek has been obscured by the development of Rohnert Park. A 1916 United States Geological Survey topographic map shows an unnamed westward-flowing creek circling north of Wilfred like Five Creek does today. At that time, the creek's headwaters lay in the Sonoma Mountains just north of Crane Creek. However, satellite photos show this channel connecting to Hinebaugh Creek north of San Mateo Court. A recent topographic map shows Five Creek emerging near the corner of Golf Course Drive and Country Club Drive, its former headwaters having been diverted to Crane Creek.

From Golf Course Drive, Five Creek flows northwest, paralleling Country Club Drive to Fairway Drive. It crosses the golf course, emerging near the end of Fauna Avenue.  North of the city limits, it turns abruptly westward and flows under U.S. Route 101 at the Santa Rosa Avenue interchange. West of U.S. Route 101, the channel turns to the southwest, crossing under Millbrae Avenue, Whistler Avenue, Wilfred Avenue, and Rohnert Park Expressway before entering the Laguna de Santa Rosa just east of Stony Point Road. 
 
However, satellite images and United States Geological Survey topographic maps, show Hinebaugh Creek entering the Laguna at those coordinates. The Five Creek confluence lies about  further west.

See also
Copeland Creek
List of watercourses in the San Francisco Bay Area

References

Rivers of Sonoma County, California
Rohnert Park, California
Rivers of Northern California
Tributaries of the Russian River (California)